Karghond Rural District is a rural district (dehestan) in Nimbeluk District, Qaen County, South Khorasan Province, Iran. At the 2006 census, its population was 4,508, in 1,258 families.  The rural district has 8 villages.

References 

Rural Districts of South Khorasan Province
Qaen County